Rockwood Municipal Airport  is a public use airport in Morgan County and Cumberland County, Tennessee, United States. Situated on Walden Ridge near the southern end of the Cumberland Plateau, the airport is convenient to Interstate 40. It is included in the National Plan of Integrated Airport Systems for 2011–2015, which categorized it as a general aviation facility.

Facilities and aircraft 
Rockwood Municipal Airport covers an area of 572 acres (231 ha) at an elevation of 1,664 feet (507 m) above mean sea level. It has one runway designated 4/22 with an asphalt surface measuring 5,000 by 100 feet (1,524 x 30 m).

For the 12-month period ending October 21, 2009, the airport had 15,500 aircraft operations, an average of 42 per day: 80% general aviation, 15% military, and 5% air taxi. At that time there were 10 aircraft based at this airport: 90% single-engine and 10% multi-engine.

References

External links 
Airport page at City of Rockwood website
 Aerial image as of March 1997 from USGS The National Map
 
 

Airports in Tennessee
Buildings and structures in Roane County, Tennessee
Transportation in Roane County, Tennessee